Saraj is one of the ten municipalities that make up the city of Skopje, the capital of the Republic of North Macedonia.
 Saraj, which means "palace" in Turkish, is also the name of the village where the municipal seat is found.
 It is a rural municipality and it is not part of the urban core of Skopje proper.

Geography
Saraj borders
 Jegunovce Municipality to the northwest,
 Želino Municipality to the southwest,
 Sopište Municipality to the south,
 Karpoš Municipality and Ǵorče Petrov Municipality to the east, and
 Kosovo to the north.

History
In the early 2000s municipal boundaries within Macedonia in some areas were redrawn. During difficult negotiations the governing Macedonian Social Democrats (SDSM) gave in to the request of its Albanian coalition partner that wanted Albanians within Skopje to surpass the 20% population mark by attaching two rural Albanian inhabited municipalities, Saraj and Kondovo. The municipalities attachment to the capital city raised the Albanian population from 15.30% to 20.49%. The change was seen as an important win among Albanians, while Macedonians were concerned with a more visible Albanian presence in Skopje and the increasing fragmentation of the urban population based on ethnicity.

Demographics

According to the last national census from 2021, Saraj has 38,399 inhabitants.

Ethnic groups in the municipality include:
Albanians = 34,586 (90.1%)
Macedonians = 1,005 (2.6%)
Bosniaks = 1,043 (2.6%)
others.

Inhabited places

There are 23 inhabited places in this municipality.

Twin towns

Twin municipalities 

 Üsküdar, Istanbul
 Kırşehir

References

External links

 Official website

 
Municipalities of North Macedonia
Municipalities of Skopje
Albanian communities in North Macedonia